Space Cadet is a 1948 military sci-fi novel for young adults by Robert A. Heinlein.

Space cadet—or similar—may also refer to:

Arts and entertainment

In multiple media
 Tom Corbett, Space Cadet, 1950s literary and audiovisual spin-offs of Heinlein's novel created by Joseph Greene

Comics
 Space Cadet (comic), a 1965 feature in the British  Ranger magazine
 Space Cadet (graphic novel), 2011, by Kid Koala—with an accompanying music CD

Music

 "Space Cadet" (song), 2019, by Metro Boomin
 Space Cadet (EP), 2019, by Beabadoobee5
 Space Cadet Solo Flight, a 1981 album by KC and the Sunshine Band
 "Space Cadet", a song by Kyuss from Welcome to Sky Valley
 "Space Cadet", a song by hip-hop artist Kollision from album Control The Streets Vol. 1
 Space Cadets, a band with Jim Capaldi on drums

Television
 Space Cadets (game show), a 1997 British television comedy panel show
 Space Cadets (TV series), a 2005 hoax event and reality show on British television
 "Space Cadet" (Recess episode)
 "Space Cadet" (Family Guy), an episode of Family Guy

Video games
 Space Cadet, a table in the Full Tilt! Pinball computer pinball simulation game
 Space Cadet, the lowest rank for a player in the arcade video game Gorf, the rank at which players start the game

Other uses
 Space-cadet keyboard, a 1978 computer keyboard layout with seven modifier keys
 Various slang uses of space cadet derived from the novel and its spin-offs

See also
 Stace Cadet, an Australian electronic music producer and DJ
 Cadet, a military trainee
 Military science fiction, the genre
 Space force, a military branch in outer space